Bob Smith (born March 25, 1947) is an American Democratic Party politician, who has been serving in the New Jersey State Senate since 2002, where he represents the 17th Legislative District. Smith was elected to his first Senate term in November 2001 to fill the seat vacated by the retirement of John Lynch. Smith serves in the Senate on the Environment Committee (as Chair) and the Judiciary Committee.

Early life 
Smith received a B.A. degree in 1969 from the University of Scranton in History, an M.S. in 1970 from the University of Scranton in Chemistry, an M.S. in 1973 from Rutgers University in Environmental Science and was awarded a J.D. in 1981 from the Seton Hall University School of Law. Smith taught environmental science and chemistry at Middlesex County College for 15 years. By profession, Senator Smith is an attorney. Smith served as Mayor of Piscataway, New Jersey from 1981 to 1986, served on the Piscataway Township Council from 1977 to 1980, its Planning Board from 1975 to 1986 (as its Chair in 1976) and on the Piscataway Environmental Committee from 1971 to 1975.

New Jersey Assembly 
Before being elected to the State Senate, Smith served in the General Assembly, the lower house of the New Jersey Legislature, from 1986 to 2001. In the Assembly, Smith served as the Deputy Minority Leader from 1994 to 1995 and as the Parliamentarian from 1988 to 1989.

New Jersey Senate 
Smith sponsored and passed laws dealing with such matters as increasing penalties for violations of environmental laws, repairing outmoded combined sewer systems, and reforming the state's oil spill prevention efforts. Senator Smith's legislative accomplishments include authoring the Ocean Pollution Bounty Act, Sludge Management Act, Oil Spill Prevention Act, the Worker and Community Right to Know Act and the Clean Water Enforcement Act. He has sought the enactment of laws affording greater protection to child victims of abuse and sponsored bills to increase the penalties for carjacking.

In 2020, he was one of the co-sponsors of Assembly Bill 4454 (now N.J.S.A. 18A:35-4.36a) which requires that a curriculum on diversity and inclusion be part of the school curriculum for students in kindergarten through twelfth grade.

Committee assignments 
Committee assignments for the 2022—23 Legislative Session session are:
Environment and Energy, Chair
Judiciary

District 17 
Each of the 40 districts in the New Jersey Legislature has one representative in the New Jersey Senate and two members in the New Jersey General Assembly. The representatives from the 17th District for the 2022—23 Legislative Session are:
Senator Bob Smith  (D)
Assemblyman Joseph Danielsen  (D)
Assemblyman Joseph V. Egan  (D)

Electoral history

Senate

Assembly

References

External links
Senator Smith's legislative web page, New Jersey Legislature
New Jersey Legislature financial disclosure forms
2011 2010 2009 2008 2007 2006 2005 2004

1947 births
Living people
Democratic Party members of the New Jersey General Assembly
Mayors of places in New Jersey
New Jersey lawyers
Democratic Party New Jersey state senators
People from Piscataway, New Jersey
Politicians from Middlesex County, New Jersey
Rutgers University alumni
Seton Hall University School of Law alumni
University of Scranton alumni
21st-century American politicians